Rochemaure is a commune in the Ardèche department in Southern France. Many inhabitants of Rochemaure are in favour of the proposed road deviation in order to preserve the historic and cultural nature of the village. It is classified as a "village of character"; however, the area currently has a major departmental road running through it. The deviation would improve safety for cyclists of the Viarhonna as well as children who attend the local schools.

Population

See also
Communes of the Ardèche department

References

Communes of Ardèche
Ardèche communes articles needing translation from French Wikipedia